Coca Cola Corporation was an Atlanta, Georgia company, the first large-scale manufacturer and marketer of  beverages based on the Coca-Cola formula, and closely related to The Coca-Cola Company, the corporation that took on that role by 1900 and became a worldwide business. 

After Asa Candler purchased the formula in 1899 from its developer, druggist John Pemberton, the latter's alcoholic son Charley Pemberton returned from Louisville, Kentucky the next year. He claimed his father had promised him the rights to the formula. The father corroborated this, and the incorporation proceeded with the younger Pemberton joining Candler and Woolfolk Walker as the principals.

With Candler and Walker soon at odds with Charley Pemberton, his father announced that it was the rights to the Coca-Cola name but not the formula that he had conveyed to the son. Though he remained a shareholder in Coca Cola Corporation, the son left the company in the summer of 1888, and began selling a lower-quality version of the beverage, under the name Coca-Cola. Fearing this would erode the value of that name, the corporation renamed its product as Yum Yum and then as Koke, with poor success.

Candler decided by 1894 to focus on the name and formula, and abandoned the troubled corporation, starting, without its other principals, a new corporation, The Coca-Cola Company. In the same year, Charley Pemberton died at the age of forty, after an apparent overdose of opium, as he was probably addicted to it like his father. 

The Coca-Cola Company remained vulnerable, until the inactive Coca Cola Corporation's charter expired in 1908, to legal challenges from it.

References
Pendergrast, Mark: For God, Country, and Coca-Cola: The Definitive History of the Great American Soft Drink and the Company That Makes It. New York: Basic Books, 2000 (second edition).

Coca-Cola
Food and drink companies based in Atlanta
Manufacturing companies based in Atlanta
Defunct manufacturing companies based in Georgia (U.S. state)